Anne Jules de Noailles, 2nd Duke of Noailles (5 February 16502 October 1708) was one of the chief generals of France towards the end of the reign of Louis XIV, and, after raising the regiment of Noailles in 1689, he commanded in Spain during both the War of the Grand Alliance and the War of the Spanish Succession, and was made marshal of France in 1693.

Family
Son of Anne de Noailles and his wife, Louise Boyer, he acceded to the title of duc de Noailles on his father's death in 1678. He was married to Marie-Françoise de Bournonville, with whom he had children. Adrien-Maurice, his eldest surviving son, succeeded him upon his death. One of his daughters, Marie Victoire, married one of King Louis XIV's illegitimate sons, the Comte de Toulouse.

Anne Jules de Noailles had many children
 Marie Christine de Noailles (1672–1748), married (1687) Antoine V de Gramont duc de Gramont, Marshal of France (1671–1725)

 Marie Charlotte de Noailles (1677–1723), married (1696) Malo, marquis de Coëtquen;
 Adrien Maurice de Noailles (1678–1766), 3rd duc de Noailles; married Françoise-Charlotte d'Aubigné, niece of Madame de Maintenon;

 Lucie Félicité de Noailles (°1683), married (1698) Victor Marie d'Estrées (1660–1737), a Marshal of France;
Marie-Thérèse de Noailles (°1684–1784), married (1698) Charles François de la Baume Le Blanc, duc de La Vallière;

 Marie-Françoise de Noailles (°1687), married (1703) Emmanuel de Beaumanoir, marquis de Lavardin;
 Marie Victoire de Noailles (1688–1766), married (1707) Louis de Pardaillan de Gondrin (1688–1712), then (1723) his half-uncle Louis-Alexandre de Bourbon, comte de Toulouse;

 Anne Louise de Noailles (°1695) married (1716) François Le Tellier, marquis de Louvois (†1719) and had issue; married again to Jacques Hippolyte Mancini, Marquis Mancini (son of Philippe Jules Mancini) and had issue; present Prince of Monaco, Albert II, is descended from this line.

See also
 Battle of the river Ter (1694)

Notes

References

Attribution

External links

Noailles, 2nd duc de
Anne-Jules
Anne-Jules
1650 births
1708 deaths
French military personnel of the Nine Years' War
French army commanders in the War of the Spanish Succession
17th-century peers of France
18th-century peers of France